Bill or Billy Jennings may refer to:

 Bill Jennings (Australian footballer) (1879–1943), Australian rules footballer
 Bill Jennings (ice hockey) (1917–1999), American ice hockey player
 Bill Jennings (American football) (1918–2002), head coach of the Nebraska Cornhuskers, 1957–1961
 Bill Jennings (footballer, born 1920) (1920–1969), British footballer with Ipswich Town, Northampton Town and Rochdale  
 Bill Jennings (baseball) (1925–2010), Major League Baseball shortstop
 Billy Jennings (Welsh footballer) (1893–1968), Bolton Wanderers and Wales international footballer
 Billy Jennings (born 1952), English footballer with Watford, West Ham United and others
 Bill Jennings (guitarist) (1919–1978), jazz guitarist

See also
 William Jennings (disambiguation)